Abigail Thorn (born 24 April 1993) is a British YouTuber, actress, and playwright, best known for producing the YouTube channel Philosophy Tube.

Philosophy Tube began in 2013, when Thorn sought to provide free lessons in philosophy in the wake of the 2012 increase in British tuition fees. In 2018, her videos became more theatrical,  beginning to incorporate dramatic studio sets, lighting, costuming and makeup. The channel has been positively received by critics, and has over one million subscribers.

In 2019, Thorn hosted a livestream on Twitch in which she read plays from the Complete Works of Shakespeare for the mental health charity Samaritans. The stream lasted five days, featured a number of guests, and raised over £100,000 for Samaritans. In September and October 2022, The Prince—a play written by and starring Thorn—ran Off West End. The transgender-themed work is based on characters in Shakespeare's Henry IV, Part 1 becoming self-aware.

Thorn publicly came out as a transgender woman in January 2021, with the video Coming Out As Trans – A Little Public Statement and the more theatrical Identity: A Trans Coming Out Story.

Early and personal life
Thorn is from Newcastle upon Tyne and has two older brothers. She attended the Royal Grammar School, where she was a member of an army cadets group. Thorn credits her discovery of philosophy to her teacher, as well as having taken the subject as an A-level course. She later studied Philosophy and Theology at the University of St. Andrews, where she also participated in Mermaids and the St Andrews Revue. Thorn graduated with a Scottish Master of Arts in Philosophy in 2015, coming top of her year. She then trained at East 15 Acting School, completing a Master of Arts awarded by the University of Essex in 2017 before moving to London.

In October 2019, Thorn discussed her sexuality in her YouTube video Queer✨, where she came out as bisexual. On 30 January 2021, Thorn came out as a trans woman. She has given speeches at protests in favour of transgender healthcare, and advocated for transgender liberation. Thorn identifies as a lesbian, as of February 2022.

Career

YouTube 
Thorn began her YouTube channel, Philosophy Tube, as an educational channel in 2013 in response to the university tuition fees tripling in the United Kingdom in 2012, rendering higher education less accessible. Thorn made it her mission statement to "[give] away a philosophy degree for free". Thorn originally planned to record her lectures and upload them, rather than appearing in videos, but her university would not allow this. Her first video titled "I think therefore I am" about René Descartes was uploaded in May 2013. Her first subscriber unsubscribed in protest when she first voiced feminist opinions. Prior to transition, Thorn presented the channel under the name Oliver Thorn and was commonly known as Olly.

Thorn makes money from both YouTube advertisement revenue and crowdfunding on Patreon. The channel's style progressed over a period of years from a direct style of talking to the camera about the works of philosophers such as René Descartes and Immanuel Kant, to more theatrical productions. In 2016, Thorn took part in the YouTube NextUp, a week-long training programme for YouTubers with under 100,000 subscribers.

Following attendance at the 2018 conference VidCon, Thorn decided to change her content creation, beginning to film at a studio with costumes and makeup. She also used props such as snakes and horses. Kayleigh Donaldson of Pajiba described Thorn's works in 2019 as "long-form think-pieces" with "detailed production design" that use aspects of sketch comedy. Emily St. James of Vox summarised that the channel covers both philosophical topics and "sociopolitical ideas of the current era from a leftist point of view". For instance, a video about the former Trump advisor and Breitbart News co-founder Steve Bannon features Thorn performing a cover of a Hadestown song, with lyrics about Bannon. St. James praised that Thorn "undercuts [Bannon's] entire shtick". In 2021, Thorn reached one million subscribers.

In July 2019, Thorn discussed her channel on the BBC radio show World Business Report. In January 2020, Dmitry Kuznetsov and Milan Ismangil, writing for tripleC, reported that the channel is a focus of an internet fan community centered around leftist YouTubers categorised as "BreadTube". The authors note fan crowdfunding, production value, criticism of the alt-right, use of citation and videos about broad topics as common BreadTube attributes that are employed by Philosophy Tube. As a case study, Thorn's Climate Grief discusses climate change through multiple personas, citing Timothy Morton's concept of hyperobjects and Terry Eagleton's Why Marx Was Right. In the video, Thorn criticises some right-wing and left-wing arguments and highlights indigenous philosophy.

Thorn's 2018 video Suic!de and Ment@l He@lth examines societal attitudes to mental health, along with her personal experiences: she has a history of self-harm and attempted suicide twice in her life. She said in mid-2019 that she still received at least one email per day by a person who said the video saved their life. Thorn's video Men. Abuse. Trauma. is about men and mental health, with reference to her personal experiences. The video is 35 minutes long, with the script entirely memorised by Thorn. There are no cuts or editing, and a single costume change is facilitated by a slow camera pan across the room; Thorn used the second of two takes. Both the script and the style of the video reference the 1944 Jean-Paul Sartre play No Exit. Emily St. James of Vox praised that the "tension and vulnerability that builds" is maintained by the lack of editing, and opined that in the video, "aesthetic form is inseparable from content".

In a 2021 interview with Insider, Thorn said she had an idea in mind for the final episode of the channel, saying that she felt the channel had been successful due to her subscriber numbers, an invitation to be a featured creator at 2021 VidCon and other YouTube channels that were inspired by her. She said that the timing of the channel's ending would depend on future acting roles.

Coming Out As Trans and Identity

On 30 January 2021, Thorn came out as a trans woman via a public statement, posted on social media and recorded as the video Coming Out As Trans – A Little Public Statement. Jezebels Harron Walker described it as a "feminist, anticapitalist appeal in support [of] trans people's legal equality, physical autonomy, and broader liberation in the United Kingdom and beyond". The statement discussed issues in access to healthcare, journalist fearmongering about transgender people and a lack of elected transgender representatives. She also says that other issues in society like homelessness disproportionately affect the trans community. "Abigail" trended on Twitter subsequent to the announcement.

Thorn also released the video Identity: A Trans Coming Out Story, which drew on the work of the American writer Audre Lorde and saw Rhys Tees acting in the role of Thorn's former self. Thorn told the Daily Xtra that studying works by trans philosophers helped her gain insight about her identity, but that she felt significant societal pressure as a transgender public figure. Prior to the announcement, she had come out to friends and family but experienced difficulties in avoiding being publicly outed in day-to-day life, and in accessing trans spaces anonymously. Her messages to other trans public figures went unanswered and she fell out of contact with a trans friend who told her that being transgender was "a curse". Thorn had chosen to act as a man in some of her videos despite having realized she was transgender, and decided to keep her pre-transition videos public because of their educational content and artistic value, and as she did not think being transgender should be a source of shame.

In a 2021 interview with Ben Hunte for the BBC, Thorn described anxiety over publicising her transition, but felt that she could not have kept it private for much longer. Thorn told Insider that prior to her transition, when male fans would refer to her as a positive role model for masculinity, "it always felt like they were talking about someone else". She described: "I tried to do the man of the 21st century thing... woke but also compassionate and fun and charming and sexy and all the rest of it... and it all made me sort of miserable really. But I understand why some of my audience felt that way". When she came out, she felt external pressure to "perform a certain model of femininity", as a "white, stylish, eloquent, charming, non-threatening woman", saying that "that's kind of what British women are expected to be".

Charity livestream 
In 2019, Thorn aimed to read the Complete Works of Shakespeare in order to raise money for the Samaritans, a UK charity that helps people in emotional distress. Thorn chose the charity because she said that its telephone hotline "saved [her] life when [she] was considering suicide". She chose Shakespeare based on the idea that "Shakespeare features every human emotion", which she attributed to Judi Dench. The stream was inspired by a January 2019 video game stream by hbomberguy which raised £278,000 ($340,000) for British transgender charity Mermaids. It was announced at the end of her YouTube video Men. Abuse. Trauma., which was released in late July 2019.

Streaming on Twitch, Thorn began on Friday 23 August and finished on Tuesday 27 August, streaming continuously with only a few hours per day for sleep. Many internet personalities joined Thorn to voice roles in the plays, such as Mara Wilson as Lady Macbeth and Dominique "SonicFox" McLean as Troilus and Cressidas Hector. Thorn initially expected to raise between $2,000 and $5,000, but said on Twitter that the stream had raised £109,447.54 (roughly $130,000) after PayPal currency conversion fees. Over 175,000 people watched the stream. The Royal Shakespeare Company praised Thorn for the endeavour, as did the Samaritans.

Acting
In the second series of Ladhood, which was released on BBC iPlayer on 15 August 2021, Thorn played the guest role of Iona, appearing in the episodes "Indie" and "The Big Day".

In May 2021, it was announced that Thorn was filming for an upcoming 10-episode television series, Django, a remake of the 1966 Western film of the same name.

The Prince
Thorn wrote and was the acting lead in the Off West End play, The Prince, at the Southwark Playhouse. The show features characters becoming self-aware and trying to escape from Shakespeare's play Henry IV, Part 1. Natasha Rickman served as director. The eight-person cast was majority-trans. Previews began on 15 September 2022 and the performance run was from 19 September 2022 to 8 October 2022. Thorn needed a security officer for protection from a stalker. In February 2023, a filmed performance of the play was released on Nebula.

The Prince has themes of transgender identity, political radicalisation and unhealthy romantic, platonic and familial relationships. Thorn described it as "Like The Matrix if it was written in 1600". The programme notes compare it to the play Rosencrantz and Guildenstern are Dead, which shows Hamlet from the perspective of two minor characters. Thorn said that Shakespeare is fit for trans allegory as performers were originally all male and the writing is dense with jokes about people dressing up as or being confused for other genders. Not seeing it as a "queer play", but more generally one about "characters who are trapped for all sorts of reasons", Thorn compared it to the period of making Philosophy Tube videos where she would conceal her gender before coming out publicly.

The play received three stars out of five in reviews from The Guardian, BroadwayWorld, The Stage and The Reviews Hub. A reviewer for The Guardian, Kate Wyver, said that it is an "ambitious if slightly feverish exploration of transgression and transition within Shakespeare's plays" that "playfully questions the performance of gender and the roles we are all assigned". Wyver found that the plot mechanics brought "frustrating confusion", but that the audience would "see these characters anew" through a queer lens, and that "glee oozes from Thorn's playful juggling of Shakespearean language around identity and performance". Cindy Marcolina, writing in BroadwayWorld, approved of The Princes "sacrilegious approach to Shakespeare" in which Thorn explores characters' psychology "with a contemporary lens" but "remaining surprisingly faithful to the original" and re-appraises Shakespeare's language around gender and bravery "under queer lights". However, Marcolina believed that "the scripted ending stands on wobbly feet and the framing never gets the explanation it needs to be satisfyingly convincing".

The Stages Frey Kwa Hawking praised the multiple trans characters and the ambition of the play, with its "tantalising ideas about the performance of gender and duty". Hawking also praised the "brittle, uneasy energy" that Thorn brought to her character, Hotspur. However, Hawking criticised aspects of the pacing and narrative, such as the "text-heavy" nature, "creaking plot mechanics", length of time spent in Shakespeare's play in the second act. Characterisation was also critiqued by Hawking, including the "under-explored" nature of Kate and Hotspur's marriage and "thinly sketched" relationship between Jen and Sam. Oliver Pattrick of The Reviews Hub similarly praised the transgender themes while criticising the writing in another three-star review, summarising that "it feels like the script needs a further rewrite to realise its full potential". Pattrick suggested that the plot mechanics be made "less prominent", that Hotspur's discovery of her womanhood needed more "depth" and slower pacing, and that the humour was overly reliant on "incongruity of blunt modern slang as a response to elaborate archaic language".

Other activities
In February 2021, Thorn joined Alice Caldwell-Kelly and Devon in hosting the podcast Kill James Bond!, a film review podcast which initially focused on the James Bond films. The podcast takes a critical angle, attempting in the words of its creators to "give 007 the socialist, feminist upcoming he so richly deserves". It peaked at #1 on Chartables list of most popular film review podcast in the U.K. Thorn said that she got involved after Caldwell-Kelly suggested the podcast on Twitter—she was familiar with the Bond films from her childhood and believed that they are flawed "in interesting ways that say interesting things about Britain". She saw Bond as symbolic of a "British sort of military masculinity" and commented that both she and Caldwell-Kelly had been army cadets as children. The podcast has reviewed the film series Bourne, Jack Ryan, and The Man from U.N.C.L.E.

Thorn narrated the audiobook for Axiom's End (2020) by Lindsay Ellis, alongside Stephanie Willis. For her narration she was jointly nominated for an Audie Award for Science Fiction.

Reception 
Shannon Strucci, writing for the magazine Sight & Sound published by the British Film Institute, said that Thorn's videos "vary tremendously" in "tone and content". Strucci described the videos as "always well-researched, inventive, and theatrical". The German broadcaster Deutsche Welle praised the videos as entertaining and elaborate in design. The channel Philosophy Tube was recommended in the Slovak broadsheet SME. The Irish author and broadcaster Emma Dabiri has enjoyed Thorn's videos. In 2021, Philosophy Tube was recommended in a list of open access streaming content in an essay for Choice Reviews, and two reviewers for The Guardians—Frances Ryan and Ammar Kalia—praised the channel.

St. James described the video Men. Abuse. Trauma. as "one of the best TV episodes of the year". Dan Schindel of Hyperallergic described the same video as a "riveting half-hour", praising its lack of cuts. The video was also praised by Lukáš Pokorný in the Czech magazine A2. Thorn's video Queer✨ was one of 134 video essays included in Sight and Sound as one of the "best video essays of 2019". Strucci reviewed for the magazine that the video was "illuminating and entertaining" as well as "joyful". Gwendolyn Ann Smith, writing for the Bay Area Reporter, praised Identity: A Trans Coming Out Story as "delving deeply into the very nature of being trans in ways [she has] not typically seen", in relation to the perspective that gender transitioning is about "revealing the truth within" rather than "becoming something that we weren't".

Schindel recommended the video Artists & Fandoms. Merryana Salem, writing for Junkee, said The Trouble with the Video Game Industry was one of her "all-time favourite Youtube videos". Salem later recommended Data—a video about ethical concerns of data mining—as one of "10 Video Essays That Will Get You Addicted To Video Essays". Wil Williams of Polygon reviewed Data as one of the Thorn's most underrated videos, comparing the format to a Platonic dialogue and the interactive film Black Mirror: Bandersnatch.

Awards and nominations
In 2022, Thorn was awarded an Off West End Theatre Award ("Offie") in the "OneOff" category. The awarding body credited her as "a pioneer for trans rights" across her YouTube work, Shakespeare charity livestream and role in The Prince.

Thorn was nominated in the category Online Influencer for a 2021 British LGBT Award. Thorn declined the nomination citing moral and political disagreements with the award's sponsors.

Acting credits

References

External links 
 YouTube channel
 Twitch account
 

1993 births
Living people
20th-century English LGBT people
20th-century English women
21st-century English actresses
21st-century English LGBT people
Actresses from Newcastle upon Tyne
Alumni of East 15 Acting School
Alumni of the University of Essex
Alumni of the University of St Andrews
Articles containing video clips
British lesbian actresses
British anti-capitalists
Commentary YouTubers
Education-related YouTube channels
English lesbian actresses
English political commentators
English social commentators
English socialists
English stage actresses
English YouTubers
English-language YouTube channels
LGBT YouTubers
English LGBT actors
Patreon creators
People educated at the Royal Grammar School, Newcastle upon Tyne
Transgender actresses
Transgender women
Video essayists
YouTube channels launched in 2013
English dramatists and playwrights